Cuckold's Point is part of a sharp bend on the River Thames on the Rotherhithe peninsula, south-east London, opposite the West India Docks and to the north of Columbia Wharf. The name comes from a post surmounted by a pair of horns that used to stand at the location, a symbol commemorating the starting point of the riotous Horn Fair, which can also symbolise a cuckold, a man whose wife had openly cheated on him.

The Horn Fair was a procession which led to Charlton. It is said that King John, or another English monarch, gave the fair as a concession, along with all the land from the point to Charlton, to a miller whose wife he had seduced after a hunting trip, though this story is disputed.

Cuckold's Point was also the location of a riverside gibbet, where the bodies of executed criminals (usually river pirates) were displayed as a deterrent to others, while it also gave its name to an adjacent shipyard during the 18th century.

Cuckold's Point is near to Pageant Crescent, Rotherhithe and to Nelson's Pier, from which the Docklands Hilton has a ferry connection to Canary Wharf.

Literary and artistic links
Cuckold's Point is mentioned in the diaries of Samuel Pepys. On Friday 20 February 1662/63, Pepys described a river journey from Woolwich back to The Temple:

"Up and by water with Commissioner Pett to Deptford, and there looked over the yard, and had a call, wherein I am very highly pleased with our new manner of call-books, being my invention. Thence thinking to have gone down to Woolwich in the Charles pleasure boat, but she run aground, it being almost low water, and so by oars to the town, and there dined, and then to the yard at Mr. Ackworth’s, discoursing with the officers of the yard about their stores of masts, which was our chief business, and having done something therein, took boat and to the pleasure boat, which was come down to fetch us back, and I could have been sick if I would in going, the wind being very fresh, but very pleasant it was, and the first time I have sailed in any one of them. It carried us to Cuckold’s Point, and so by oars to the Temple, it raining hard, where missed speaking with my cosen Roger, and so walked home and to my office; there spent the night till bed time, and so home to supper and to bed."

It is also mentioned by Daniel Defoe in his description of London (Letter V) and in A Journal of the Plague Year (part XX).

The location is the subject of a painting, A Morning, with a View of Cuckold's Point (c. 1750–1760), by Samuel Scott, currently in the collection of the Tate Gallery.

References

History of the London Borough of Southwark
Geography of the River Thames
Rotherhithe